A katepanikion was a Byzantine term for an area under the control of a katepano. It was used to describe two different types of administrative divisions:

 From ca. 971 until the late 11th century, it referred to large circumscriptions comprising several themes and commanded by a doux ("duke") or katepano ("catepan"). In English, the divisions are usually termed "duchy" (in Greek doukaton) or "catepanate" (katepanikion).
 In the Palaiologan period, the katepanikion became a much smaller province comprising a fortified town and its surroundings or an island, under a kephale and also termed a kephalatikion.

See also
Catepanate of Italy
Catepanate of Ras

Subdivisions of the Byzantine Empire
Types of administrative division